Fair is an English, Danish, German, and Jewish surname. The name may have derived from the Old Norse word fær meaning 'capable' or the Old German word fæger meaning 'the fair and beautiful one'. The name may refer to:

People
Aubrey Fair (1881–1954), English footballer
Brian Fair (born 1975), American singer
Bryan Fair (born 1960), American legal scholar
C. Christine Fair (born 1968), American professor of political science
C. J. Fair (born 1991), American basketball player
Charles M. Fair (1916–2014), American neuroscientist
Charnette Fair (born 1979), American volleyball player
Damien Fair, American neuroscientist
David Fair (born 1952), American activist
Dick Fair (1907–1982), Australian actor
Elinor Fair (1903–1957), American actress
Elizabeth Fair (1908–1997), English novelist
George Fair (1856–1939), American Major League baseball player
J Henry Fair, American photographer and environmentalist
Jad Fair (born 1954), American singer
James Fair (field hockey) (born 1981), English field hockey player
James Graham Fair (1831–1894), Irish-American mining engineer
James R. Fair (1920–2010), American chemical engineer
Jamie Fair (born 1945), American politician
Jeff Fair (born 1947), American football trainer
Jonny Fair, American musician
Joseph Fair, American virologist
Keith Fair (born 1968), Canadian-born Swiss ice hockey player
Kevin Fair, Canadian TV and film director
Laura Fair (1837–1919), American murderer
Lex Fair (1926–1995), Irish religious leader
Lorrie Fair (born 1978), American professional soccer midfielder
Martin Fair (born 1964), Scottish religious leader
Mike Fair (born 1946),  American politician
Mike Fair (Oklahoma politician) (1942–2022), American politician
Ray Fair (born 1942), American professor of economics
Robert Fair (Canadian politician) (1891–1954), Canadian politician
Robert James Fair (1919–2002), American politician
Robert Leahy Fair (1923–1983), American military leader
Ron Fair, American record producer
Ronald Fair (1932–2018), American writer and sculptor
Ronnie Fair (born 1978), American soccer player
Terry Fair (born 1976), American football player and coach
Terry Fair (basketball) (1960–2020), American-Israeli professional basketball player
Vic Fair (1938–2017), English poster artist
W. B. Fair (1850–1909), English music hall performer
William Robert Fair (1922–1996), American businessman
Woody Fair (1914–2000), American baseball player
Yvonne Fair (1942–1994), American singer
Zora Fair (died 1865), American Confederate spy

Fictional characters
Seymore D. Fair, the mascot of the 1984 Louisiana World Exposition
Zack Fair, a character from the video game Final Fantasy VII

See also
Fair (band)
List of people known as the Fair
Fairs (surname)

References